Ndungu, or Ndung'u, is a surname of Kenyan origin that may refer to:

Njoki Susanna Ndung'u (born 1965), Kenyan lawyer and associate justice of the Supreme Court of Kenya
Njuguna Ndung'u (born 1960), Kenyan economist and Governor of the Central Bank of Kenya
Samuel Ndungu (born 1988), Kenyan long-distance runner based in Japan
Thumbi Ndung'u, Kenyan medic and AIDS researcher

See also
Ndungu Land Commission, public investigation into land use in Kenya

Kenyan names
Surnames of Kenyan origin